Las Delicias may refer to:
 Las Delicias, Mexico
 Las Delicias, Bocas del Toro, Panama
 Las Delicias, Trujillo, La Libertad Region, Peru
 Las Delicias (Madrid), a ward (barrio) of Madrid, Spain
 Estadio Las Delicias, stadium in El Salvador
 Plaza Las Delicias, plaza in Ponce, Puerto Rico

See also
 El jardín de las delicias, 1970 Spanish film
 Delicias (disambiguation)